A concert residency (also known as musical residency or simply residency) is a series of concerts, similar to a concert tour, but only performed at one location. Pollstar Awards defined residency as a run of 10 or more shows at a single venue. An artist who performs on a concert residency is called a resident performer. Concert residencies have been the staple of the Las Vegas Strip for decades, pioneered by singer-pianist Liberace in the 1940s and Frank Sinatra with the Rat Pack in the 1950s.

Céline Dion's A New Day... is the most successful concert residency of all time, grossing over US$385 million ($ million in  dollars) and drawing nearly three million people to 717 shows. This commercial success was credited for changing and revitalizing Las Vegas residencies, which were once known as where singers go when their careers are in decline. Céline Dion is further recognized as the "Queen of Las Vegas".

History
The concept of a concert residency was established by pianist and singer Liberace with a 1944 debut in Las Vegas. Nearly ten years later, Liberace had his own show at the Riviera Hotel and Casino in Las Vegas, which reportedly earned "Mr. Showtime" around $50,000 per week. After years of pursuing other projects in Los Angeles, he returned to Vegas residency and earned around $300,000 a week until he died of AIDS in 1987.

Liberace's 1944 debut was followed by Frank Sinatra with the Rat Pack, and Elvis Presley. In April 1956, Presley began a two-week concert residency at the New Frontier Hotel and Casino, Las Vegas, following the release of his self-titled debut album. His shows were poorly received by the conservative, middle-aged hotel guests—"like a jug of corn liquor at a champagne party," wrote a critic for Newsweek. From 1969 to 1976, Presley performed 837 consecutive sold-out shows at the Hilton Las Vegas, which has since been renamed the Westgate Las Vegas Resort & Casino.

Kurt Melien, vice president of entertainment at Caesars Palace, explained that "Historically, Vegas residencies were more a loss leader event – famous artists playing in small showrooms just to draw in the gambling crowds." In the live music world, Las Vegas used to be known as the place where singers went to die, where they could earn a crust in their twilight years entertaining tourists on the Strip alongside magicians like David Copperfield, or Siegfried & Roy. Music journalist Jim Farber stated, "There used to be a certain element of cheesiness to playing in Vegas. I talked to Cher about that, and she referred to it as an 'elephant graveyard where talent goes to die' — and she was speaking of herself."

Céline Dion revitalized residencies in the 21st century, with the success of her A New Day... residency (2003–2007). Her residency introduced a new form of theatrical entertainment, a fusion of song, performance art, innovative stage craft, and state-of-the-art technology. She managed to popularize the Las Vegas residency as a desirable way for top artists to essentially tour in place, letting their fans come to them. Kurth Meline explained, "Céline was a pioneer without question. Twenty years ago, we couldn't have got someone the stature of Britney Spears to appear in Vegas. Stars like her would never have considered it if Céline hadn't paved the way. She changed the face of modern Vegas." Dion returned to Las Vegas with her second residency, Céline, and performed her record-breaking 1000th show on October 8, 2016.

During the 2010s, many other major performers have followed and accepted residency offers. These include a variety of performers from EDM DJs such as Tiesto and Calvin Harris, rock bands such as Def Leppard and Aerosmith, to hip hop acts such as Drake and Cardi B. By 2017, a tenth of Forbes Celebrity 100 had signed a residency contract in Las Vegas.

Venue
For decades, Las Vegas has been the central destination for concert residencies. New York City has also grown as a residency destination, beginning with Billy Joel at Madison Square Garden in 2014. American rock band Phish also performed 13-shows residency at the same venue, from July 21 to August 6, 2017. Bruce Springsteen held his 2017–18 residency, Springsteen on Broadway, at the Walter Kerr Theatre in New York City. In August and September 2007, the O2 Arena in London held 21 Prince shows. From January to March 2009, Luis Miguel played a run of 25 shows at Auditorio Nacional in Mexico City. Michael Jackson had scheduled 50 concerts in 2009 at The O2 Arena in London, but they were cancelled due to his death. Mexican rock band Maná signed a residency tour at the LA Forum in Los Angeles, CA. “Maná: LA Residencia”, exclusively at the venue starting March 2022 and will continue until the end of the year or until ticket sales drop.

Box office

One of the most successful residencies in history was Elvis Presley's 636 consecutive shows at the International and Las Vegas Hilton from July 1969 through December 1976. However, the box-office data for his residency is unavailable. Céline Dion's A New Day... is the most successful concert residency of all time, grossing over US$385 million ($ million in  dollars) and drawing nearly three million people to 717 shows. Her second residency, Céline, is the second most successful one, generating $296 million from a total of 427 shows between 2011 and 2019. These two residencies made Dion the highest-grossing resident performer of all time.

Following Céline Dion, Elton John has become the second most successful concert resident performer, whose The Red Piano residency grossed a reported $169 million between 2004 and 2009. Another top-selling residency was Britney Spears's Britney: Piece of Me, which began in December 2013 and ended on December 31, 2017, grossing over U$137 million.

Outside of Las Vegas, Bruce Springsteen grossed over $113 million with 236 shows of his New York residency Springsteen on Broadway. Billy Joel has grossed nearly $130 million with his monthly residency at Madison Square Garden since 2014.

References

External links

Concert Residency at Consequence of Sound

 
Music performance